Wales, a country that is part of the United Kingdom, contains protected areas under various designations. The largest designation by land area is Wales' three national parks, followed by the five Areas of Outstanding Natural Beauty (sometimes collectively the "Designated Landscapes of Wales"). 

Among these protected areas is Snowdonia, Wales' first and the UK's third designated national park, and the Gower AONB covering parts of the Gower Peninsula being both Wales' and the UK's first Area of Outstanding Natural Beauty (AONB), as well as smaller designations.

National parks

Wales is home to three national parks.

Snowdonia National Park – was established in 1951 as the third national park in the UK, following the Peak District and the Lake District.

Pembrokeshire Coast National Park – is a national park along the Pembrokeshire coast in West Wales. It was established as a National Park in 1952, and is the only one in the United Kingdom to have been designated primarily because of its spectacular coastline.

Brecon Beacons National Park – founded in 1957, stretching from Llandeilo in the west to Hay-on-Wye in the east, covering  and encompassing four main regions – the Black Mountain in the west, Fforest Fawr and the Brecon Beacons in the centre, and the Black Mountains in the east.

Areas of Outstanding Natural Beauty

Five Areas of Outstanding Natural Beauty (AONB) have been designated in Wales, one of which, the Wye Valley AONB, straddles the Anglo-Welsh border.

The Gower is a peninsula on the south west coast of Wales, on the north side of the Bristol Channel in the southwest of the historic county of Glamorgan.

Llŷn ( or ) is a peninsula which extends  into the Irish Sea from north west Wales, south west of the Isle of Anglesey. Much of the coastline and the ex-volcanic hills are part of the Llŷn AONB, confirming the peninsula as one of the most scientifically important in both Wales and Britain.

Anglesey was designated an AONB in 1966, in order to protect the aesthetic appeal and variety of the island's coastal landscape and habitats from inappropriate development. The AONB covers most of Anglesey's  coastline, as well as inland areas, such as Holyhead Mountain and Mynydd Bodafon.

The Wye Valley AONB, designated in 1971, is an internationally important protected landscape straddling the border between England and Wales. It is one of the most dramatic and scenic landscape areas in southern Britain. The River Wye is the fifth-longest river in the United Kingdom. The upper part of the river passes through the settlements of Rhayader, Builth Wells and Hay-on-Wye, but the area designated as an AONB surrounds only the 58-mile stretch lower down the river, from just south of the city of Hereford to Chepstow.

The Clwydian Range and Dee Valley is a series of hills and mountains in north east Wales that runs from Llandegla in the south to Prestatyn in the north, with the highest point of the Clwydian Range being the popular Moel Famau. It was designated as an AONB in 1985.

Heritage Coast

There are fourteen heritage coasts in Wales. They are "stretches of outstanding, undeveloped coast in England and Wales", which are not protected by law (except where covered by other protected areas), but are given special consideration by planning authorities. They are:
Glamorgan Heritage Coast – 
Great Orme Heritage Coast
Gower Heritage Coast
North Anglesey Heritage Coast – 
Holyhead Mountain Anglesey Heritage Coast – 
Aberffraw Bay Anglesey Heritage Coast – 
Llŷn Heritage Coast
South Pembrokeshire Heritage Coast
Marloes and Dale Pembrokeshire Heritage Coast
St Brides Bay Pembrokeshire Heritage Coast
St Davids Peninsula Pembrokeshire Heritage Coast
Dinas Head Pembrokeshire Heritage Coast
St Dogmaels & Molygrove Pembrokeshire Heritage Coast
Ceredigion Heritage Coast –

Sites of Special Scientific Interest

A Site of Special Scientific Interest (SSSI) is a conservation designation denoting a protected area in the United Kingdom. SSSIs are the basic building block of site-based nature conservation legislation and most other legal nature/geological conservation designations in Great Britain are based upon them, including national nature reserves, Ramsar sites, Special Protection Areas, and Special Areas of Conservation. Sites notified for their biological interest are known as Biological SSSIs, and those notified for geological or physiographic interest are Geological SSSIs. Many SSSIs are notified for both biological and geological interest.

Lists of SSSIs
Brecknock
Carmarthen & Dinefwr
Ceredigion
Clwyd
East Gwynedd
Gwent
Mid & South Glamorgan
Montgomery
Preseli & South Pembrokeshire
Radnor
West Glamorgan
West Gwynedd

Special Areas of Conservation

A Special Area of Conservation (SAC) is defined in the European Union's Habitats Directive (92/43/EEC), also known as the Directive on the Conservation of Natural Habitats and of Wild Fauna and Flora. They are to protect the 220 habitats and approximately 1000 species listed in annex I and II of the directive which are considered to be of European interest following criteria given in the directive. They must be chosen from the Sites of Community Importance by the State Members and designated SAC by an act assuring the conservation measures of the natural habitat.

Special Protection Areas

A Special Protection Area (SPA) is a designation under the European Union Directive on the Conservation of Wild Birds. Under the Directive, Member States of the European Union (EU) have a duty to safeguard the habitats of migratory birds and certain particularly threatened birds. Together with Special Areas of Conservation (SACs), the SPAs form a network of protected sites across the EU, called Natura 2000. Each SPA has an EU code – for example the Burry Inlet SPA has the code UK9015011.

Scheduled ancient monuments

Scheduled monuments in Wales are in the care of Cadw, the historic environment service of the Welsh Government.

Local nature reserves

Local nature reserves (LNR) have their origin in the recommendations of the Wild Life Conservation Special Committee (Conservation of Nature in England and Wales, Command 7122, 1947) which established the framework for nature conservation in the United Kingdom and suggested a national suite of protected areas comprising national nature reserves, conservation areas (which incorporated suggestions for Sites of Special Scientific Interest), national parks, Geological Monuments, local nature reserves and local educational nature reserves. There are now 73 LNRs in Wales, covering .

References